John Betjeman Goes By Train is a short documentary film made by British Transport Films and BBC East Anglia in 1962. The 10-minute-long film features future poet laureate John Betjeman as he takes a memorable journey by train from King's Lynn railway station to Hunstanton railway station in Norfolk, pointing out various sights and stopping off at Wolferton station on the Sandringham Estate and Snettisham station, where he extols the virtues of rural branchline stations. An early example of a Betjeman travelogue film, a similar idea was later used for his 1973 documentary Metro-land.

References

External links
 

1962 films
1960s short documentary films
British Transport Films
British short documentary films
Documentary films about rail transport
Documentary films about poets
1962 documentary films
Documentary films about England
1962 short films
1960s English-language films
1960s British films